Wittus Witt (born 1949)  is a German magician, author, museum director and publisher.

Biography 
Witt went to the State Art Academy in Dusseldorf to study an art teacher. Afterwards, he moved to the College of Design in Dusseldorf in 1976 and earned his degree as a designer.

From 1993 to 1995 he appeared regularly on the radio and  has performed over two hundred times on television. From 1994 to 1997 he had his own television series: "Tele-spell with Wittus Witt" in which he performed interactive magic tricks every second week live with a spectator.

Witt is one of the founding members of the association of full-time magicians "The Professionals", which met for the first time in autumn 1989.

Since 1977 Witt has published the well-known magic directory "International Magic Yellow Pages" which appear in a 3-years cycle.  The publication contains currently more than 1,300 names from all over the world.  Since 2006 it is also available as an E-book version.

In 2000 he took over Germany's magic magazine Magische Welt, in which he previously published articles and a column. He has also developed the German language version of Magicpedia.

In 2011 Witt founded the annual Hamburg magic nights, in which several magicians show their full evening shows during one weekend.

In 2012 he opened Germany’s first art gallery dedicated to the art of magic and visual art connected with magic. After ten years he closed down the gallery and opened Germany’s first cultural museum for the art of magic, named "Bellachini", December 18th, 2022.

Awards
 First Prize Comedy Magic 1976, Vienna, FISM World Congress of Magic

Books

Weblinks 
 Magic Museum Bellachini

References

 
 Bio-bibliographisches Lexikon der Zauberkünstler Edition Volker Huber, April 2002, Witt, Hans-Günter = Wittus Witt, page 238 
 Genii, Vol. 55, No. 4, February 1992, OUR FEATURE: Wittus Witt, page 246

1949 births
German magicians
People from Gütersloh (district)
German male writers
Historians of magic
Living people